Stictocephala is a genus of treehoppers in the family Membracidae; in the subfamily Smiliinae and tribe Ceresini. Species appear to be distributed mostly in North America, but S. bisonia has become widely distributed in Europe.

Species
The Catalogue of Life lists:
 Stictocephala albescens
 Stictocephala alta
 Stictocephala basalis
 Stictocephala bisonia
 Stictocephala brevicornis
 Stictocephala brevis
 Stictocephala brevitylus
 Stictocephala diceros
 Stictocephala diminuta
 Stictocephala lutea
 Stictocephala militaris
 Stictocephala nervosa
 Stictocephala ornithisca
 Stictocephala palmeri
 Stictocephala stimulea
 Stictocephala substriata
 Stictocephala taurina
 Stictocephala tauriniformis

References

External links
 

Smiliinae
Auchenorrhyncha genera